The strap-toothed beaked whale (Mesoplodon layardii), also known as Layard's beaked whale, is one of the largest members of the mesoplodont genus, growing to  in length and reaching up to .
The common and scientific name was given in honor of Edgar Leopold Layard, the curator of the South African Museum, who prepared drawings of a skull and sent them to the British taxonomist John Edward Gray, who described the species in 1865.

Description

Adult strap-toothed beaked whales show a distinctive colouration that perhaps makes them one of the most readily distinguishable beaked whale species. Adults have a white beak, with a pale white 'cape' that extends to halfway between the dorsal fin and head. The dorsal fin is set far back down the body and is white-tipped. The flukes also have white tips. When observed closely, either at sea or when stranded, these whales show a pale neckband that separates the darker grey colouration found upon the head and melon from the rest of the body. While adult whales show striking colouration, juvenile animals are harder to distinguish from other beaked whale species, having a uniform grey colouration.

Beaked whales show remarkable sexual dimorphism in that only the males retain functional teeth. Male strap-toothed beaked whales begin to develop a large flat tusk from each lower jaw as juveniles, growing at a 45° angle back towards the head and over the rostrum (beak). Reaching up to 34 cm in length, the teeth may overlap at the tips, restricting the gape size of the animal. Two stranded adult male strap-toothed beaked whales were recorded as only being able to open their mouths 3.2 cm and 4 cm wide, compared to females and juveniles that had a gape size of 6.5 cm. It is thought male beaked whales use their teeth to compete for mating access to females, as evidenced by scars and scratches on the bodies of males. However it is unlikely the whale uses the whole tusk for such aggressive interactions, instead, it is probable that only a small denticle found upon the upper surface of the tooth is utilised.

Geographical range/ distribution

Based on sporadic sightings and a number of stranded animals, it appears that the Strap-toothed beaked whale ranges widely across the Southern Ocean, with a possible circumpolar distribution in sub-Antarctic and temperate waters. Records for the species have been made in Tierra del Fuego and Chubut in Argentina, the Falkland Islands, Western and Southern Australia and New Zealand.

The northernmost extent of the range is continually changing; strandings were noted at 31–32° south of the equator along Brazil's southern coast  until an emaciated individual was found at 13° S on Maré Island off the north-east coast of Brazil in 2002. However, in 2011 an adult male strap-toothed beaked whale stranded alive in [Myanmar] at 16° north of the equator; more than 5000 km further north than the previously accepted range of the species. The whale died and a necropsy revealed that there was no prey within the stomach, but the overall body condition was good.

It is possible that this species migrates due to the seasonality of observed strandings.

Behaviour
Little is known about the behaviour of this species. Beaked whales are thought to travel in small groups, and observed group sizes for the strap-toothed beaked whale range from two to ten individuals.
Social structure of Mesoplodonts in general is largely understudied, due to the difficulty of observing individuals at sea. It is possible that group sizes and composition are controlled by the type of rostrum and teeth found amongst the various species. Larger and heavily armed species that can inflict wounds generally travel in groups where only one or two males are present, reducing the risk of aggressive interactions.
Despite having large tusks, male strap-toothed beaked whales likely only use a small protruding denticle on each tooth in antagonistic interactions. Subsequently, this species may travel in groups with multiple males as the risk of serious injury is lessened.

The species is reported to bask at the water's surface on calm days, but is noted to be difficult to approach in vessels. Strap-toothed beaked whales typically do not show their flukes upon diving. A number of observations suggest that diving is typified by a slow descent beneath the surface, with dive duration lasting between 10 and 15 minutes. The species can travel at speed, and may show 'porpoising' behaviour.
 
The killer whale (Orcinus orca) is a documented predator of this species, and has been recorded chasing, attacking and killing a solitary adult strap-toothed whale approximately 50 km offshore of Bremer Bay in south-western Australia.

The main prey of the strap-tooth beaked whale is considered to be oceanic squid species. In an extensive dietary analysis of 14 stranded whales from New Zealand and South Africa, 94.8% of the stomach contents were composed of cephalopods, with evidence of some fish and crustaceans. A difference in the shape of consumed prey was noted between male and female whales, but it was determined that both sexes targeted squid of a similar size. While adult males have a restricted gape size due to the position of their overlapping tusks, it is possible that this allows them to create more suction when feeding, allowing them to forage effectively on the same prey as females and juveniles.

Population status

The size of the population is unknown, however it has been noted that the species is one of the more common beaked whale species found in the southern ocean.

Threats

Strap-toothed beaked whales have not been commercially hunted; however, they are at risk from entanglement and disturbance from anthropogenic noise. Intense noise, particularly that from sonar, has been shown to cause panic, rapid ascent and subsequent death due to decompression sickness in a number of beaked whale species.

As the species has a largely circumpolar distribution, it is likely to be at risk from the impacts of anthropogenic climate change. The International Union for the Conservation of Nature (IUCN) lists habitat alteration and habitat shift as possible threats related to climate change.

See also

List of cetaceans

References

 Encyclopedia of Marine Mammals. Edited by William F. Perrin, Bernd Wursig, and J.G.M Thewissen. Academic Press, 2002.

External links

 Photo of skull of straptoothed whale
 Factsheets
 Strap-toothed whale discussed on RNZ Critter of the Week, 10 March 2023
 Cetaceans of the World

Mesoplodont whales
Mammals described in 1865
Taxa named by John Edward Gray